

Overview 
The Kapthurin Formation is a basalt outcrop in Kenya near Lake Bogoria and Lake Baringo.

Part of the East African Rift System, it is also an important archaeological site in the study of early humans who occupied the area and left Acheulean stone tools and animal bones behind.

The Kapthurin Formation has been used to study the Acheulian-Middle Stone Age transition.

Argon–argon dating of volcanic ash overlying ochre fragments found there has dated what may represent some of the earliest human aesthetic sensibility to 285,000 years ago. The ochre fragments must have been brought to the site by human agency and may have been used as body adornment.

References 

 Sources
Tryon, CA and McBrearty, S, 2002, "Tephrostatigraphy and the Acheulean to Middle Stone Age transition in the Kapthurin Formation, Kenya", Journal of Human Evolution 42, 211–35, qtd in Scarre, C (ed.) (2005). The Human Past, London: Thames and Hudson. .

Archaeological sites in Kenya
Pleistocene
Archaeological sites of Eastern Africa